Tall Kohneh or Toll Kohneh or Tal-e Kohneh or Tol-e Kohneh may refer to:
 Tall Kohneh, Fars
 Tall Kohneh, Khuzestan